Oreochromis chungruruensis, the Kiungululu tilapia, is a species of cichlid fish that is endemic to Lake Chungruru (also known as Kiungululu), a small isolated crater lake in the Rungwe District in southern Tanzania. It is critically endangered due to overfishing and non-native tilapia species that have been introduced to Lake Chungruru.

References

chun
Endemic freshwater fish of Tanzania
Critically endangered fish
Critically endangered fauna of Africa
Fish described in 1924
Taxonomy articles created by Polbot